The women's qualification for the 2004 Olympic women's basketball tournament occurred from 2002–2003; all five FIBA (International Basketball Federation) zones sent in teams.

The first qualifying tournament was the 2002 FIBA World Championship for Women in which the champion was guaranteed a place in the Olympics. Throughout the next two years, several regional tournaments served as qualification for the zonal tournaments, which doubles as intercontinental championships, to determine which teams were to participate in the 2004 Athens Summer Olympics.

Qualification
A total of 12 teams took part in the Olympics, with each NOC sending in one team.

The host nation (Greece) qualified automatically as hosts.

United States qualified automatically by winning at the 2002 FIBA World Championship for Women.

The other 10 teams were determined by five zonal tournaments (doubling as continental championships), held in 2003. Each zone was allocated with the following qualifying berths:
FIBA Africa: 1 team (Champion)
FIBA Americas: 1 teams (Champion)
FIBA Asia: 3 teams (Champion, runner-up and third place)
FIBA Europe: 3 teams (Champion, runner-up and third place)
FIBA Oceania: 2 teams (Champion and runner-up)

Summary

These are the final standings of the different Olympic qualifying tournaments. The venues are as follows:
2002 FIBA World Championship for Women: Nanjing (China)
FIBA Africa Championship 2003: Maputo (Mozambique)
FIBA Americas Championship for Women 2003: Culiacan (Mexico)
FIBA Asia Championship for Women 2003: Sendai (Japan)
EuroBasket Women 2003: Patras (Greece)
FIBA Oceania Championship 2003: Launceston, Davenport (Australia)

References

Basketball at the 2004 Summer Olympics – Women's tournament
basketball
2004